Cimbicidae is a family of sawflies in the order Hymenoptera. There are more than 20 genera and 200 described species in Cimbicidae.  Larvae are solitary herbivores.

The family is distinctive in having antennae with prominent apical clubs or knobs. The adults of some species can exceed 3 cm in length, and are among the heaviest of all Hymenoptera.

Genera
These genera belong to the family Cimbicidae:

 Abia Leach, 1817
 Agenocimbex Rohwer, 1910
 Allabia Semenov & Gussakorskii, 1937
 Brasilabia Conde, 1937
 Cimbex Olivier, 1791
 Corynis Thunberg, 1789
 Leptocimbex Semenov, 1896
 Lopesiana Smith, 1988
 Odontocimbex Malaise, 1935
 Pachylosticta Klug, 1824
 Praia Wankowicz, 1880
 Pseudabia Schrottky, 1910
 Pseudocimbex Rohwer, 1908
 Pseudoclavellaria Schulz, 1906
 Pseudopachylosticta Mallach, 1929
 Trichiosoma Leach, 1817
 † Cenocimbex Nel, 2004
 † Eopachylosticta Malaise, 1945
 † Phenacoperga Cockerell, 1908
 † Sinocimbex Zhang Junfeng, Sun Bo & Zhang Xiyu, 1994
 † Trichiosomites Brues, 1908

References

External links

 

Tenthredinoidea
Sawfly families